United Health Services (UHS) (United Health Services Hospitals, Inc.) is the largest and most comprehensive provider of healthcare services in upstate New York's Southern Tier.

A locally owned, not-for-profit system, it is governed by a volunteer board of directors composed of residents from around the region. Founded in [Greater Binghamton] in 1981, UHS was formed through the consolidation of three highly respected community hospitals.  Over the years it has grown to encompass four hospitals, long-term care and home care services, walk-in centers and affiliated physician practices in [Broome] and surrounding counties.

The organization operates primary care centers throughout Broome, Chenango, Delaware and Tioga, Otsego, and Sullivan counties, plus school-based health centers that offer primary and preventive care to students in the region.

UHS cares for two-thirds of the population of the Southern Tier region and produces $1.3 billion a year in total non-profit economic impact.  With a 6,300-member work force across 60 locations, UHS is one of the region's largest employers.

UHS is the regional referral center for a number of life-saving and life-enhancing medical, surgical and rehabilitative specialties, including:  trauma and emergency care, heart and vascular surgery, cardiac care, neurosurgery and neurosciences, cancer care, orthopedics, behavioral health services, high-risk obstetrics, neonatal intensive care, and physical rehabilitation.

A teaching hospital, UHS Wilson Medical Center is home to a long-standing medical residency program, training tomorrow's practicing doctors.  The program is an affiliate of the Clinical Campus at Binghamton of SUNY Upstate Medical University in Syracuse and the New York Institute of Technology College of Osteopathic Medicine.

Member organizations
Members of United Health Services 

 UHS Hospitals
 UHS Wilson Medical Center, Johnson City
 UHS Binghamton General Hospital, Binghamton
 UHS Chenango Memorial Hospital, Norwich
 UHS Senior Living at Chenango Memorial
 UHS Delaware Valley Hospital, Walton
 UHS Senior Living at Ideal, Endicott
 UHS Home Care, Johnson City

Affiliates
Affiliates of United Health Services (UHS):
UHS Medical Group
UHS Foundation

See also
 List of hospitals in New York

References

External links
 UHS official website

Healthcare in New York (state)
Hospital networks in the United States
Companies based in Binghamton, New York
Medical and health organizations based in New York (state)